Niqmaddu III was the seventh known ruler and king of Ugarit, an Ancient Syrian citystate in northwestern Syria, reigning from 1225 to 1220 BC, succeeding king Ibiranu. He took his name from the earlier Amorite ruler Niqmaddu, meaning "Addu has vindicated" to strengthen the supposed origins of his Ugaritic dynasty in the Amorites.

A text from the Urtenu archives mentions that he was married to an unnamed Hittite princess. He is mentioned in many juridical texts, most notably in a lawsuit between him and "Kumiya-Ziti", probably a rich merchant from Ura. The author of the tablet is "Nu?me Rašap?", which is detailed as a well-known scribe who was known from the days of Ammittamru II, and another legal text details him, the "Case of Kililya the priest of Istar", which is witnessed by the same witnesses and written by the same scribe.

References

Ugaritic kings
13th-century BC rulers
13th-century BC people